Devil's Sinkhole State Natural Area is a natural bat habitat near the city of Rocksprings in  Edwards County in the U.S. state of Texas. Carved by water erosion, the cavern is home to several million Mexican free-tailed bats that emerge at sunset during April through October.

History
The Devil's Sinkhole is a vertical natural bat habitat.

While likely known to native peoples, the cavern was first discovered in modern times by Ammon Billings, a local rancher leading a scouting party of five, west of Hackberry Creek in Edwards County in 1876. Billings fired at a marauding party of hostile Indians and believed he hit one. Fearing a trap, they did not pursue the Indians but returned to the area the following day, May 21, 1876 with their spouses. It was then that the sinkhole was first encountered by Ammon Billings. Billings wife, Lucinde Katherine Billings (née Stroop) and other wives in the returning party dubbed the sinkhole "The Devil's Sinkhole".

H. S. Barber carved his name inside the cave in 1889. In 1968, the Devil's Sinkhole was designated as a National Natural Landmark by the National Park Service.

The area was transferred to the state of Texas in 1985, and opened to the public in 1992.

Facilities, admission
Access to the area is available only through advance reservations. Evening bat flight tours are offered in summer only. Guided nature hikes are also available.

Facilities include a wheelchair-accessible viewing platform and picnic areas. With reservations, tours are conducted by the Devil's Sinkhole Society, a local volunteer group that works in conjunction of Texas Parks and Wildlife Department and Bat Conservation International to facilitate visitor education and tours.

See also
List of museums in Central Texas
 List of sinkholes of the United States
National Register of Historic Places listings in Edwards County, Texas

References

External links
 Bat Conservation International
TPWD Devil's Sinkhole official site
Texas Power Coop - To the Bat Cave

Bat conservation
Protected areas of Edwards County, Texas
State parks of Texas
Sinkholes of the United States
Landforms of Edwards County, Texas
National Natural Landmarks in Texas
Protected areas established in 1985
1985 establishments in Texas